Justine Cotsonas (born May 31, 1985) is an American actress. She was born in Mineola, New York.

Cotsonas attended New York University's Tisch School of the Arts, where she earned a BFA degree in January 2007. She joined the cast of As the World Turns in July 2007.

Filmography

Film

Television

References

External links

American soap opera actresses
Tisch School of the Arts alumni
1985 births
Living people
American television actresses
People from Mineola, New York
Actresses from New York (state)